Logan Crowley is a rugby union player who currently plays for Taranaki in the Bunnings NPC. He previously played for Canterbury. He is the son of Alan Crowley who played 83 matches for Taranaki; he is also the nephew of All Black Kieran Crowley and Sean and Neil Crowley who also played for Taranaki. He plays for Coastal Rugby club in Taranaki.

References

External links
itsrugby.co.uk profile

New Zealand rugby union players
1996 births
Living people
Rugby union scrum-halves
Taranaki rugby union players
Southland rugby union players